Trinity Academy is a state-run secondary school in the north of Edinburgh, Scotland. It is located on the border between Trinity and Leith, next to Victoria Park, and a short distance from the banks of the Firth of Forth at Newhaven.

Admissions
Trinity Academy was formerly a fee paying, selective senior secondary school, prior to the abolition of the Selective Qualifying Exam, which was normally taken in Primary 7 at age 11 or 12 years. It is now a non-selective, comprehensive school, and receives most of its first year pupils from three local 'feeder' primary schools; Trinity Primary
(which is immediately adjacent), Victoria Primary in Newhaven, and Wardie Primary in Wardie.

History 
The school was designed in 1891 by George Craig, a Leith architect for the Leith School Board.

Rugby
Trinity Academy's first XV rugby team won Rugby World Team of the Month in November 2005 after an unbeaten run including away wins at George Heriot's, Glenalmond and Hutchison Grammar School.
Bangholm sports ground is also home to the Trinity Academicals Rugby Football Club.

Rectors
Nick Burge (2020-)
Bryan Paterson (2015–2020)
Alec Morris (2008–2015)
Peter Galloway C.B.E. (1983–2008)
William Brodie (1969–1983)
Alexander Neill (1953–1969)
Dr. Albert Weir (1942–1953)
James Scott (1925–1942)
Thomas Duncan (1901–1925)
Thomas Trotter (1893–1901)

Notable alumni

 Mark Watt, Scottish Cricket International (Scotland national cricket team), (Derbyshire County Cricket Club)
 Lewis Niven, Rugby Player
Alexander Bennett (1929–2003), ballet dancer
 Sir William Patey (1971), British Diplomat
 Sam Stanton, footballer (Dundee United)
 Martin O'Neill, Baron O'Neill of Clackmannan, Scottish politician
 Gordon Connell, Scottish rugby international
 Darren Jackson, Scottish Football International/Hibernian
 Darren McGregor, footballer (Hibernian F.C.)
 Danny Swanson, footballer (Hibernian F.C.)
 John Alexander Fraser (posthumously awarded George Cross for gallantry)
 Malcolm MacPherson (1904 - 1971) - politician)
 Paul Mitchell (broadcaster), sports commentator
 Roy Moller, Scottish singer, songwriter and poet

References

External links 
 Trinity Academy Parent Council

Secondary schools in Edinburgh
Educational institutions established in 1893
1893 establishments in Scotland
Buildings and structures in Leith